The following is a timeline of the history of Hong Kong.

Imperial China

Colonial Hong Kong

British Crown colony

British Crown colony

HKSAR

See also
 Political events in Hong Kong since 1997
 Timeline of Chinese history
 Hong Kong 1 July marches

References

External links 
Hong Kong Timeline at Mtholyoke

Hong Kong history
History timeline
History of Hong Kong